Daniel L. Fapp, A.S.C. (April 21, 1904 – July 19, 1986) was an American cinematographer, best known as the director of photography for West Side Story (1961), for which he won an Academy Award for Best Cinematography, and The Great Escape (1963). He also was nominated for Academy Awards for his cinematography for Desire Under the Elms (1958), The Five Pennies (1959), One, Two, Three (1961), The Unsinkable Molly Brown (1964), Ice Station Zebra (1968) and Marooned (1969).

Life
Fapp was born in Kansas City, Kansas.

He died in Laguna Niguel, California, at the age of 82.

Movies
Daniel L. Fapp either made or participated in the following movies:
Kitty (1945)
To Each His Own (1946)
The Big Clock (1948)
Sorrowful Jones (1949)
Union Station (1950)
The Girls of Pleasure Island (1953)
Knock on Wood (1954)
Living It Up (1954)
The Far Horizons (1955)
The Birds and the Bees (1956)
The Joker Is Wild (1957)
Desire Under the Elms (1958)
Kings Go Forth (1958)
The Trap (1959)
All the Young Men (1960)
Let's Make Love (1960)
One, Two, Three (1961)
West Side Story (1961) (director of photography)
GE True (1 episode, 1962)
The Pigeon That Took Rome (1962)
Bachelor Flat (1962)
Move Over, Darling (1963)
Fun in Acapulco (1963) (director of photography)
A New Kind of Love (1963)
The Great Escape (1963) (director of photography)
The Pleasure Seekers (1964)
Send Me No Flowers (1964) (as Daniel Fapp)
The Unsinkable Molly Brown (1964)
I'll Take Sweden (1965)
Spinout (1966)
Lord Love a Duck (1966)
Our Man Flint (1966)
Double Trouble (1967)
Ice Station Zebra (1968)
5 Card Stud (1968)
Sweet November (1968)
Marooned (1969)

References

Daniel L. Fapp at Find a Grave

1904 births
1986 deaths
American cinematographers
People from Kansas City, Kansas
Best Cinematographer Academy Award winners
Burials at Hollywood Forever Cemetery